Elisha Scott (24 August 1893 – 16 May 1959) was a Northern Irish football goalkeeper who played for Liverpool from 1912 to 1934, and still holds the record as their longest-serving player.

Life and playing career
Elisha Scott played for Linfield and Broadway United before Liverpool manager Tom Watson signed him at 10 am on Sunday 1 September 1912, following a recommendation from Scott's older brother Billy Scott. Liverpool only got the chance to sign Scott when Everton decided that the 19-year-old Elisha was too young.

Scott was reported as signed by Crewe Alexandra in August 1913, presumably under some sort of loan arrangement. He succeeded Thomas Charles Allison as deputy for the first choice keeper, Arthur Box and played for them in the early part of season 1913/14.

Scott finally made his Liverpool debut on 1 January 1913 at St James' Park. The team drew 0–0 with Newcastle.

During the early days of his career, Scott was understudy to Ken Campbell and only appeared occasionally.  The First World War interrupted Scott's career for four years. Scott finally got a chance of a run in the Liverpool goal at the end of the season. Scott's goalkeeping position was set in stone when Campbell was allowed to leave in the April 1920. Scott established himself as Liverpool's number 1. He was a major part of the back-to-back Championship winning teams of 1922 and 1923, missing just 3 games of the first title and none in the second.

Numerous stories about Scott exist in Liverpool folklore. One such story relates to a 1924 game, after Scott had just made a phenomenal save at Ewood Park against Blackburn. A man appeared from the crowd went over to Scott and kissed him. Scott was part of one of the legendary rivalries of the day along with Everton's Dixie Dean. The two of them were the main topic of discussion when derby day was approaching – Everton declared that Dean would score whilst Liverpool disagreed, saying Scott wouldn't let a single shot past. A famous story, possibly apocryphal, associated with the two men was that of how they once encountered each other in Belfast city centre the day before an Ireland versus England game. Dean, famed for his remarkable heading ability touched his hat and nodded to Scott as they were about to pass only for Scott to respond by diving as if to try to save an imaginary header, much to the initial shock and then delight of the locals who witnessed it while a mildly shocked Dean smiled and quietly continued on his walk.

Towards the end of the decade, Scott lost his starting position to another Liverpool goalkeeper, Arthur Riley, but he never gave up the battle for the position of goalkeeper. However, at the beginning of the 1930s it was becoming more and more difficult for Scott to get into the line-up; eventually Scott asked if he could return to his homeland when his old team Belfast Celtic offered him a player-manager role in 1934. Liverpool consented. Scott played the last of his 467 appearances at Chelsea on 21 February 1934.

Chelsea defeated Liverpool 2–0 in Scott's final appearance at Chelsea. Upon Liverpool's final home match of the season Scott headed to the director's box to give his adoring fans a farewell speech. Scott played his final game for the Belfast club in 1936 at the age of 42. In his time as manager of the Celtics Scott won 10 Irish League titles, 6 Irish Cups, 3 City Cups, 8 Gold Cups and 5 County Antrim Shields.

He died in 1959 and is buried in Belfast City Cemetery.

Career statistics

International

Honours

Player

Liverpool

Football League First Division: 2
1921–22, 1922–23

Belfast Celtic

Irish League
Winners 1918–19, 1935–36
Irish Cup
Winners 1917–18
Gold Cup
Winners 1935
County Antrim Shield
Winners 1936

Manager

Belfast Celtic

Irish League
Winners 1936, 1937, 1938, 1939, 1940, 1941, 1942, 1944, 1947, 1948: 10
Irish Cup
Winners  1937, 1938, 1941, 1943, 1944, 1947: 6
Gold Cup
Winners 1935, 1939, 1940, 1941, 1944, 1945, 1946, 1947: 8
County Antrim Shield
Winners 1936, 1937, 1939, 1943, 1945 5
Belfast City Cup
Winners 1940, 1948, 1949 3

Sources
The Official Liverpool FC Illustrated History (Carlton Books 2002), p37.

References

Further reading
Elisha Scott's Diaries and Press Cuttings: His Life Story by Hedley Lawson (Privately Published, 2012).

External links
 
 Player profile at LFChistory.net

1893 births
1959 deaths
Belfast Celtic F.C. players
Linfield F.C. players
Liverpool F.C. players
Association footballers from Belfast
Association football goalkeepers
Liverpool F.C. non-playing staff
Association footballers from Northern Ireland
Football managers from Northern Ireland
Pre-1950 IFA international footballers
Irish League representative players
Burials at Belfast City Cemetery
Ireland (IFA) wartime international footballers